The Great Lakes XSG was an amphibious observation aircraft developed in the United States in the early 1930s for a US Navy competition. It was an ungainly and unorthodox biplane design with a single large pontoon mounted below the lower wing. This pontoon extended rearwards and carried the conventional empennage. On top of the lower wing, where the fuselage would normally be located, was a stubby nacelle containing the tractor-mounted engine and the pilot's cockpit. The rear of this nacelle was semi-enclosed with glazing and incorporated a position for a tail gunner. The main units of the wheeled undercarriage retracted into the sides of the central pontoon.

Development quickly ended when trials revealed that the aircraft was incapable of reaching the speeds required by the Navy, and only a single prototype was ever built.

Specifications

References

 

S01G
1930s United States military reconnaissance aircraft
Single-engined tractor aircraft
Biplanes
Amphibious aircraft
Aircraft first flown in 1931